Paladin Career and Technical High School is a Minnesota public charter school in Coon Rapids, Minnesota, in the United States. It opened in September 2002 and teaches grades 9–12.

Curriculum 

Students must meet the education requirements of the state to obtain a high school diploma.

Governance 

Paladin Career and Technical High School is a Minnesota non-profit and is designated as a 501(c)3 by the Internal Revenue Service. The school board is elected by the school community, in accordance with Minnesota Statute 124D.10.

Student population 

Paladin Career & Technical High School serves an at-risk population of students, which may include those with family, health or other social problems. In 2009, Paladin Career Tech was mentioned in an article about the growing homeless population in the northern metro area of Minneapolis–Saint Paul.

References

Schools in Anoka County, Minnesota
Public high schools in Minnesota
Public middle schools in Minnesota
Charter schools in Minnesota
Blaine, Minnesota
2002 establishments in Minnesota